Louise Thérèse Blouin (born 1958/59) is a media entrepreneur and the Chairman of Louise Blouin Media. The company is a global media business that has a commitment to the arts and culture, producing around 50 magazines and 130 titles each year. Some of the group's publications include Art + Auction, Modern Painters, and Culture + Travel. The websites, artinfo.com and myartinfo.com, were the company's initiatives and were meant to be the premier online destinations for the arts. “Artinfo” was rebranded as  BlouinArtinfo. Other websites include  Blouin Art Sales Index,  Blouin Shop, Blouin News and Blouin Subscriptions. The Blouin Art Sales Index (BASI) is an art price database with millions of auction records dating back to 1922 from over 1400 auction houses.

In addition to her role at Louise Blouin Media, Blouin is also the founder of the Global Creative Leadership Summit. This platform addresses the challenges of globalization and is a key initiative of the Louise Blouin Foundation. The foundation believes in the importance of promoting cultural understanding and enhancing creativity, particularly through advances in neuroscience. Some of the foundation's projects include the annual Global Creative Leadership Summit in New York, a research initiative with the OECD measuring global cultural investment, and various cultural exchange projects. The foundation also operates the Louise Blouin Institute, an arts center in Notting Hill, London, which has showcased the works of artists such as James Turrell, Gary Hill, Richard Meier, and Wang Guangyi.

Before starting Louise Blouin Media and the Louise Blouin Foundation, Blouin co-founded Trader Classified Media. She was one of the pioneers of internet commerce and served as the Chairman and Operational CEO for over 15 years. During her time at Trader, she turned around 80 companies and led a team of over 5,000 employees. She launched 60 magazines and built an international business with over 400 publications and 60 internet sites in 20 countries, reaching 9 million readers per week. Blouin eventually left Trader to fully focus on the development of Louise Blouin Media.

Early life and education
Blouin was born in the suburbs of Montreal, in Quebec, Canada, the sixth child of parents who owned an insurance brokerage. Her father died when she was fifteen. She studied commerce at McGill University, and later transferred to Concordia University. She did not graduate.  She attended Harvard Business School.

Career 
Blouin worked as a stock analyst and as a stockbroker. She later married John MacBain and the couple acquired Auto Hebdo, a classified car trading magazine, in 1987. The business grew into Trader Classified Media. Although the couple separated in 2000,  Blouin did not sell her remaining shareholding until 2004. She sold them for $200 million to her husband. After the separation she became CEO of the London auction house Phillips de Pury, owned by her new companion Simon de Pury; in December 2002, after a year, she resigned. She started Louise Blouin Media in 2003 and moved into art publications.

In 2005 Blouin started the Louise T. Blouin Foundation, an international organization for creativity and the arts. In October 2006 the foundation opened the Louise T. Blouin Institute in Shepherd's Bush in west London.

Blouin married Mathew Kabatoff, who worked for the Louise Blouin Foundation, in France in June 2011.

In 2016, her name appeared in the Panama Papers as registered owner of five companies in the British Virgin Islands. She commented, "I didn't even know. It is not relevant. It is not because you are in the Panama list that you did something wrong. You are the one informing me about that. You can't assume everyone with a BVI [company] has done something wrong".

Personal life 
In the early 1980s, Blouin married David MacDonald Stewart, a member of the Canadian MacDonald tobacco family. The marriage was annulled within a year. 

In 1987, Blouin married John MacBain. In 2000, the MacBains divorced. They had three children.

Blouin lives in Switzerland.

Recognition 

In 1993 Blouin was one of approximately 200 "Global Leaders of Tomorrow" listed by the World Economic Forum, a Swiss foundation.

References

1950s births
Living people
Harvard Business School people
Canadian art collectors
Women art collectors
Businesspeople from Montreal
20th-century Canadian philanthropists
Canadian women in business
People named in the Panama Papers
Canadian women philanthropists
21st-century Canadian philanthropists